Christian Stuart Elder (December 6, 1968 – August 12, 2007) was an American racing driver. He raced in the Busch Series for Akins Motorsports for two years. His best finish of the year was 26th at Kentucky.

Elder made his debut in 2001, running his first race at Las Vegas for Akins where he started the race in 32nd, and he finished 23rd. In sixteen starts, he managed two top-20s (a pair of 20ths at Bristol and Dover). In 2002, Elder began running races for Akins full-time.  A serious crash in qualifying at Chicagoland Speedway ended his Busch career. 

Elder has competed in the ARCA series, Star Mazda Series, Speed World Challenge Series, Busch Series and NASCAR Goody's Dash Series which Elder competed in and won races at Daytona and Lowe's Motor Speedway.  He also had a pole position at Bristol Motor Speedway.

Qualifying crash 

During qualifying for a race at Chicagoland Speedway, Elder lost control of his car at turns three and four, causing his car to shoot up the track and hit the wall extremely hard, slamming the car's right side past the windshield, badly wrinkling the whole side of the car. He suffered a concussion and a broken collar bone. Track rescue workers had to cut him out of the race car and Elder was transported to a nearby hospital. The crash ended his racing career.

Death 
Elder died at his home in Cornelius, North Carolina, on Sunday, August 12, 2007, due to accidental methadone toxicity, caused by mixing up pills he was taking due to his accident. At the time of his death, Elder was a project manager for Elder-Jones, Inc. in Charlotte, North Carolina.

Motorsports career results

NASCAR
(key) (Bold – Pole position awarded by qualifying time. Italics – Pole position earned by points standings or practice time. * – Most laps led.)

Busch Series

References

External links

 
 Obituary
 Elder Racing
 Elder-Jones, Inc. homepage
 Motorsport.com
 Photo Archive

1968 births
2007 deaths
People from Bloomington, Minnesota
Racing drivers from Minneapolis
Racing drivers from Minnesota
NASCAR drivers
ISCARS Dash Touring Series drivers
People from Cornelius, North Carolina